Renae Geerlings (born November 4, 1974) is an American actress, singer, writer, film producer and comics editor. She is best known for starring in the 2009 horror remake Halloween II as well as the supernatural thriller Compound Fracture, which she also co-wrote and produced.

Career
Geerlings became an editor for Top Cow Comics in 1996, working on various titles such as Battle of the Planets, Tomb Raider, No Honor, and Witchblade. In 2005, she appeared in a segment of America's Most Wanted followed by a role in the short film, Blame (2006). Also in 2006, she was promoted to Editor-in-Chief at Top Cow before leaving the company the following year. She currently works at Darby Pop Publishing.

In 2009, she appeared as Deputy Gwynne in Rob Zombie's remake of Halloween II (2009), also co-starring her husband Tyler Mane. Despite mixed reviews, the film was a commercial success when released on August 28, 2009. In 2010, she and her husband launched the production company, Mane Entertainment. She stars as Juliette in their first feature, the supernatural thriller Compound Fracture, released in 2013. She will next be seen as Precious in their follow-up film, Penance Lane.

Personal life
Geerlings has been married to actor and former wrestler Tyler Mane since 2007.

Filmography

References

External links
 Facebook page
 

Living people
American film actresses
21st-century American actresses
Comic book editors
Place of birth missing (living people)
1974 births